Pai Tau Village is a village located in Sha Tin, Hong Kong.

Administration
Pai Tau is a recognized village under the New Territories Small House Policy. It is one of the villages represented within the Sha Tin Rural Committee. For electoral purposes, Pai Tau Village is part of the Lek Yuen constituency, which was formerly represented by Jimmy Sham Tsz-kit until July 2021.

Location
The village is located next to Sha Tin station on the Hong Kong MTR.

Features
 The buildings at Nos. 5A, 5B, 5C and 6 Pai Tau Village are listed as Grade II Historic Buildings.
 The Lam Ancestral Hall in Pai Tau Village, is a Grade III Historic Building.

See also
 Grand Central Plaza § Footbridge controversy
 Kau Yeuk (Sha Tin)
 Sha Tin Rural Committee
 Ten Thousand Buddhas Monastery

References

External links

 Delineation of area of existing village Pai Tau (Sha Tin) for election of resident representative (2019 to 2022)
 Antiquities and Monuments Office. Hong Kong Traditional Chinese Architectural Information System. Pai Tau Village
 Antiquities and Monuments Office. Historic Building Appraisal. Nos. 5A, 5B, 5C & 6 Pai Tau, Sha Tin Pictures: 5A 5B 5C 6
 Antiquities and Monuments Office. Historic Building Appraisal. Lam Ancestral Hall, Nos. 8, 10-14 Pai Tau, Sha Tin Pictures

Villages in Sha Tin District, Hong Kong
Sha Tin